Scrobipalpula inornata is a moth in the family Gelechiidae. It was described by Bernard Landry in 2010. It is found on the Galápagos Islands.

The length of the forewings is 3.1-3.7 mm. The forewings are beige, with scales that are darker tinged toward the apical one-third of the wing and the base of the costa. The hindwings are greyish brown.

Etymology
The species name refers to the absence of markings on the forewings.

References

Scrobipalpula
Moths described in 2010